Heather Jeanne Fong (born  1956) is the former chief of police for San Francisco, California, United States. She is the first woman to lead the San Francisco Police Department, and the first Asian American woman to head a major metropolitan city police force. She is also the second Asian American police chief in SFPD history, the other being Fred Lau.

Fong became the Interim San Francisco police chief in January 2004 after Alex Fagan Sr. was reassigned by Gavin Newsom. She became the permanent police chief in April 2004.

Fong most recently served as the Department of Homeland Security Assistant Secretary for State and Local Law Enforcement, a position she held since November 17, 2014. She left the position at the end of the Obama administration.

Early life and education
Her ancestral roots are in Ho Chung village, Chung Shan County (now in Zhongshan City), Guangdong Province, China.

In high school, Fong joined the Police Athletic League's cadet academy for two years. She graduated from St. Rose Academy in Western Addition, San Francisco in 1974.

Fong grew up in the North Beach neighborhood of San Francisco and holds a Bachelor of Arts degree from the University of San Francisco and a Master of Social Work degree from San Francisco State University. In college, Fong was a member of the United States Air Force ROTC and worked as a police cadet.

Fong graduated from the police academy on August 15, 1977. At the time, the San Francisco Police Department was under pressure to hire more minorities and women, as they had only two Asian American officers and no female officers in 1974.

Career
Shortly after graduating from the police academy, Fong was put on the Golden Dragon massacre case. She transferred to the police academy in 1979 as an instructor. She was placed as one of two female child abuse investigators in 1983 and then worked in the department's planning and community outreach department starting in 1986. In 1992, she worked one year as a youth investigator.	

She was promoted to lieutenant in 1993, captain in 1994, commander in 1998, deputy chief in 2000, and assistant chief in 2003. In 1996, Chief Fred Lau assigned Fong to captain the department's Central Station, which oversees Chinatown, North Beach, Union Square and the Financial District.	

Fong was assigned to the Special Operations Division in August 1998 when she was promoted to commander. While there, she was responsible for the Traffic, Tactical, and MUNI Transit companies. In June 2000, upon promotion to deputy chief, she was assigned to the Field Operations Bureau, where she managed the uniformed patrol personnel of the San Francisco Police Department. In August 2002, she was assigned to oversee the Administration Bureau. In May 2003, she was appointed assistant chief of police.

Chief of Police 
Mayor Gavin Newsom was impressed with Fong's performance during Fajitagate. He appointed her acting chief of police on January 22, 2004, and chief of police on April 14, 2004.
Fong drew criticism in June 2008 for failing to complete firearm recertification for over five years though all San Francisco police officers are required to recertify annually by department regulations. Fong was quoted as saying that she was too busy to recertify. When the controversy erupted in the local media, she was recertified a week later.

In 2008, Fong became embroiled in a promotion scandal and faced pushback from SFPD rank and file over her controversial plan to cut the rank of Inspector (equivalent to Detective). About 53 San Francisco police officers filed a complaint with the Civil Service Commission. They tested for Q-35 jobs as inspectors 10 years prior, but Fong has decided to eliminate that position, and fill those investigative roles with Q-50 sergeants. 40 to 50 percent of the knowledge and abilities needed for an inspector were not covered by the sergeants test. The San Francisco Police Commission subsequently determined that Fong had acted improperly, and that personnel from the 1998 Q-35 inspectors list should have been hired instead of sergeants. Litigation is presently ongoing for the plaintiff officers, 39 in total and many part of the original Civil Service Commission complaint who are now retired.

Retirement
Fong announced in December 2008 that she would be stepping down in April 2009, after serving five years as San Francisco's police chief.

Fong receives some $264,000 annually in pension payments. The high amount of pension payments to Fong and other retired top officials in San Francisco's police and fire departments has prompted critical comment.

See also

 San Francisco Police Department
 San Francisco Police Officers Association

References

  SF Chronicle on Fong retirement

External links
 Official San Francisco government biography

1956 births
Living people
American people of Chinese descent
San Francisco Police Department chiefs
People from San Francisco
University of San Francisco alumni
San Francisco State University alumni